Nicole Renee DeHuff (January 6, 1975 – February 16, 2005) was an American actress.  She is noted for role in the comedy movie Meet the Parents.

Early life
DeHuff was born in Antlers, Oklahoma, and raised in Broken Bow, Oklahoma, and Oklahoma City. She began her acting career by earning a bachelor's degree in drama from Carnegie Mellon University. She also met and later married executive producer and director Ari Palitz, whom she met at Carnegie Mellon.

Career
DeHuff landed her first big role in the hit movie comedy Meet the Parents, in which she played Teri Polo's character's sister, Deborah Byrnes.
After Meet the Parents, DeHuff had a regular role in the 2002 TV series The Court and appeared in CSI: Miami, Without a Trace, Dragnet, The Practice, and Monk.

Death
In the days preceding her death, DeHuff checked into two hospitals for respiratory illnesses, and was misdiagnosed both times as having bronchitis. She was sent home and directed to take Tylenol in addition to being prescribed an antibiotic.  However, her health worsened.  On February 16, 2005, paramedics rushed to her home after she collapsed, gasping for air. She subsequently lost consciousness en route to the hospital.  By the time the doctor discovered her true illness, pneumonia, it was too late.  Shortly upon arrival to the facility, she died of the illness at the age of 30.

Between 2004 and 2005, DeHuff worked on three feature films. One of these, Unbeatable Harold, her final film which was released posthumously, was directed by her husband.

Filmography

References

External links

1975 births
2005 deaths
People from Antlers, Oklahoma
American film actresses
Carnegie Mellon University College of Fine Arts alumni
Deaths from pneumonia in California
21st-century American actresses